Dağpınar is a belde (town) in Digor district of Kars Province, Turkey at . It is situated on a high plateau between Kars and Digor. The population of Dağpınar is 3285 as of 2010.

References

Populated places in Kars Province
Towns in Turkey
Digor District
Kurdish settlements in Turkey